The Power Five conferences are the five most prominent and highest-earning athletic conferences in college football in the United States. They are part of the Football Bowl Subdivision (FBS) of NCAA Division I, the highest level of collegiate football in the nation, and are considered the most "elite" conferences within that tier. The Power Five conferences have provided nearly all of the participants in the College Football Playoff since its inception, are guaranteed at least one bid to a New Year's Six bowl game, and have been granted autonomy from certain NCAA rules. The Power Five conferences are the Atlantic Coast Conference (ACC), Big Ten Conference, Big 12 Conference, Pac-12 Conference, and Southeastern Conference (SEC).

The term Power Five is not defined by the National Collegiate Athletic Association (NCAA), and the origin of the term is unknown. It has been used in its current meaning since at least 2006. However, the Power Five conferences are identified individually under NCAA rules as "autonomy conferences," which grants them some independence from standard NCAA rules to provide additional resources for the benefit of student-athletes. The term is also occasionally used in other college sports, although in many non-football sports, most notably basketball, anywhere from six to ten conferences may be considered "high-major"–the Big East Conference, Atlantic 10 Conference, American Athletic Conference (AAC), Mountain West Conference, and West Coast Conference, in addition to the Power Five football conferences.

The Power Five conferences make up five of the ten conferences in FBS; the other FBS conferences are informally known as the Group of Five—the AAC, Mountain West, Conference USA, Mid-American Conference (MAC), and the Sun Belt Conference. The FBS consists of the Power Five, the Group of Five, and a small number of independent schools (among those schools long-time independents Army and Notre Dame, along with other schools that typically stay independent for a few years before moving to a conference). Prior to the establishment of the College Football Playoff in 2014, the Power Five conferences, as well as the old Big East Conference, were called Automatic Qualifying (AQ) conferences, because the champion of each conference received an automatic berth in one of the five Bowl Championship Series (BCS) bowl games. The final college football season for which the BCS was in effect was the 2013 season. With the split of the old Big East in 2013, there are now five "power," or top-tier, conferences.

As of the conclusion of the 2021–22 school year, only two of the soon-to-be sixty-nine Power Five conference schools have never won a National Championship in any sport, Kansas State of the Big 12 and Virginia Tech of the ACC.

Current conferences and teams
The ten current FBS conferences are listed below. For the Power Five, the member universities of each conference are also listed.

Power Five

* The University of Notre Dame is a full voting member of the ACC, and although its football team does not participate in ACC football and competes as a football independent, it is obligated to play an average of five football games a year against ACC opponents. In 2020, during the COVID-19 pandemic, Notre Dame entered into a full ACC football schedule and was eligible for the conference's championship. Notre Dame fields 24 other varsity sports that compete in the ACC, as well as men's ice hockey which competes in the Big Ten Conference.

** The University of Oklahoma and University of Texas have announced they will leave the Big 12 Conference in 2024, and join the SEC. BYU, Cincinnati, Houston, and UCF have accepted invitations to join the Big 12 in 2023.

*** UCLA and USC have announced they will leave the Pac-12 and join the Big Ten beginning in 2024.

Group of Five

Map of current teams

Under the College Football Playoff system
With the establishment of the College Football Playoff in 2014, the term "automatic qualifying conference" is no longer in use, as the Bowl Championship Series (BCS) has been discontinued. However, five of the six former AQ conferences are now known as the "Power Five conferences": the Big Ten Conference, the Big 12 Conference, the Atlantic Coast Conference (ACC), the Pac-12 Conference, and the Southeastern Conference (SEC). The sixth AQ conference, the Big East, was split up during the 2010–2014 NCAA conference realignment, with five members joining P5 conferences, Notre Dame establishing a relationship with the ACC, the remaining non-football members forming the new Big East Conference, and the remaining members forming the American Athletic Conference. It is unknown where the term "Power Five Conference" originated from; it is not officially documented anywhere by the NCAA.

The American, as well as Conference USA (C-USA), the Mid-American Conference (MAC), the Mountain West Conference (MW), and the Sun Belt Conference are known as the "Group of Five" (sometimes called the G5).

The FBS also has seven independent schools as of the current 2022 season: Notre Dame, Army, BYU, Liberty, New Mexico State, UConn, and UMass. Notre Dame is currently considered equal to the Power Five schools, being a full (with the exception of football) member of the ACC with an annual five-game football scheduling agreement with that conference; Notre Dame also has its own national television contract and its own arrangement for access to the CFP-affiliated bowl games should it meet stated competitive criteria. All Power Five leagues that require their members to schedule at least one Power Five team in nonconference play (currently the ACC, Big Ten, Big 12, SEC, and Pac-12) consider Notre Dame to be a Power Five opponent for such purposes. The ACC, Big Ten, and SEC also count BYU as a Power Five opponent for scheduling purposes, and the Big Ten and SEC count Army as well. Three of these schools will leave the independent ranks after the 2022 season—BYU will join the Big 12, thereby becoming a Power Five program, and Liberty and New Mexico State will join Conference USA.

Teams from the Power Five and the Group of Five play each other during the season, and sometimes also play against FCS teams. However, many coaches of Power Five schools have argued that Power Five schools should only be allowed to schedule games against other Power Five schools. In 2014, the NCAA gave the Power Five conferences greater autonomy in regard to issues such as stipends and recruiting rules. Some Power Five conferences, including the Big Ten and SEC, require their teams to play at least one non-conference P5 opponent each season.

The College Football Playoff rotates among six bowl games, with two bowl games used as each year as the national semi-finals, and four other bowls matching the remaining top teams in the country. These six bowl games are collectively known as the "New Year's Six" bowl games. Conference champions from the Power Five are not guaranteed a spot in the playoffs, and at least one will always be left out of the playoffs. While no rule makes Group of Five teams ineligible for the playoffs, no such team was ranked higher than #8 in the final CFP rankings (UCF in 2018) until Cincinnati was #4 in 2021; selectors regularly claim these teams typically have weaker schedules. The aforementioned 2021 Cincinnati team was the first Group of Five team to ever be ranked in the top four by the committee at any point during the season. Cincinnati along with the aforementioned UCF and Houston will also join the Big 12, thereby becoming Power 5 programs. 

Each conference champion from the Power Five and the highest-ranked Group of Five conference champion is guaranteed a spot in a New Year's Six Bowl. Every year, a non-Power Five team is guaranteed one bid to the New Year's Six bowls; however, so far no additional bids beyond that one have been granted.

Power Five vs Group of Five New Year's Six Games
College Football Playoff semifinal in bold. Group of Five team in italics.

TV and revenues

Realignment since the 1990s
The FBS has undergone several waves of realignment since the 1990s, when the Bowl Coalition was established.  The first realignment occurred in the 1990s, and resulted in the demise of the Southwest Conference, which was a member of the Bowl Coalition and at times considered equal to some of the Power Five conferences; as well as many schools giving up independent status to join conferences.  In the early 1990s, Arkansas left the Southwest Conference for the SEC; the original Big East Conference began sponsoring football, with eight former football independents joining either for all sports or football only; and other major independents such as Florida State (to the ACC), Penn State (to the Big Ten), and South Carolina (to the SEC) joined major conferences. In the 1996 NCAA conference realignment, the SWC dissolved, and four Texas teams from that conference joined with the Big 8 schools to form the Big 12 Conference.

During another phase of realignment in 2005, three schools (Boston College, Miami-FL and Virginia Tech) jumped from the Big East to the ACC, and Temple also left the conference (before eventually returning in 2013).  The Big East responded by adding former basketball-only member Connecticut and three schools from C-USA.

College football underwent another major conference realignment from 2010 to 2014, as the Big Ten and Pac-10 sought to become large enough to stage championship games. Members of the original Big East left the conference to join the Big 12, Big Ten, and ACC. The Big 12 lost members to the SEC, the Pac-12, and the Big Ten, while the Big Ten also gained one former ACC member. The remaining members of the Big East split into two conferences: the American Athletic Conference (the American) and a new Big East Conference that does not sponsor football (only three of the original 10 members of the current Big East sponsor football, all at the second-tier Division I FCS level). The American, the football successor to the Big East, is no longer considered a power conference. Despite the major conference realignment from 2010 to 2014, relatively few schools dropped out of or joined the ranks of the power conferences. Two of the three non-AQ schools that had appeared in multiple BCS bowls left the Mountain West Conference and joined a power conference, as Utah joined the Pac-12 and TCU joined the Big 12. Former Big East members Temple, Cincinnati, and South Florida are all now part of The American; another former Big East member, UConn, left American Conference football after the 2019 season to become an FBS independent while otherwise joining the current Big East. Of these, only Temple was a founding member of the Big East in football.

The most recent major realignment is currently ongoing. During a period of less than two months in 2021, the Big 12 both gained and lost members. First, on July 30, the conference lost two of its mainstays when Oklahoma and Texas announced that they would leave for the SEC no later than 2025; the two schools later reached a buyout agreement that will allow them to join the SEC in 2024. The Big 12 reloaded by announcing four new members on September 10, initially announcing that American members Cincinnati, Houston, and UCF plus FBS independent BYU would join no later than 2024. BYU's initial announcement stated that it would join in 2023, and the other three schools' 2023 entry date was officially confirmed after they reached a buyout agreement with The American. On June 30, 2022, Pac-12 mainstays UCLA and USC announced they would move to the Big Ten in 2024.

At present, six of the nine former members of the Southwest Conference are in Power Five conferences: Arkansas and Texas A&M are members of the SEC, while TCU, Baylor, Texas, and Texas Tech are members of the Big 12. Houston and SMU are members of the American, with Houston now set to join the Big 12 in 2023, while Rice is a member of Conference USA and set to join The American in 2023.

Under the BCS system
From 1998 to 2013, the top teams in Division I FBS played in the BCS. It consisted of four or five bowl games, with a national championship game either rotating among the bowl sites (prior to the 2006 season) or played as a separate game. The BCS succeeded two other systems that were put in place after the 1991 season in order to ensure that one national champion could be crowned at the end of the season. The original Bowl Coalition consisted of the SEC, the Big Eight Conference (later succeeded by the Big 12), the Southwest Conference (SWC), the ACC, the Big East, and Notre Dame. The BCS added the Pac-10 (now known as the Pac-12) and the Big Ten, while the SWC dissolved in 1996. In 2013, the Big East split into two conferences, and its successor, the American Athletic Conference (The American), took the Big East's place for the 2013 season.

In addition to creating a national championship game, the BCS also created a set format for other major bowls. After the two top teams in the BCS rankings were matched up in the BCS National Championship Game, the other three or (after the 2005 season) four bowls selected other top teams. The term "BCS conference" was used by many fans to refer to one of the six conferences whose champions received an automatic berth in one of the five BCS bowl games, although the BCS itself used the term "automatic qualifying conference" (AQ conference). While the number of AQ conferences was technically variable, the BCS always had six AQ conferences since its inception in 1998. The Mountain West Conference (MW) was perhaps the closest of the other conferences to getting AQ status, but its request for AQ status was denied in 2012. Each of the bowls had a historic link with one or more of the six BCS conferences with the exception of the former Big East, and the bowl games selected a team from each of these conferences if it was eligible for a BCS bowl and not playing in the national title game. The conferences included in this group, with their traditional bowl links, were:

Big East Conference (The American in 2013) (not tied to any specific BCS bowl)
Atlantic Coast Conference (Orange Bowl)
Big 12 Conference (Fiesta Bowl)
Big Ten Conference (Rose Bowl)
Pac-12 Conference (Rose Bowl)
Southeastern Conference (Sugar Bowl)

Notre Dame is an independent in football, but was a founding member of the BCS. Because of the "Notre Dame rule", it had guaranteed access to the BCS bowls when it met certain defined performance criteria.

The other five conferences (listed below) were non-AQ conferences because they did not receive an annual automatic bid to a BCS bowl game. The highest ranked champion of any non-AQ conference received an AQ bid if they ranked in the top 12 of the final BCS poll or ranked in the top 16 and higher than a champion of an AQ conference.

The conferences in this group were:
Conference USA (C-USA)
Mid-American Conference (MAC)
Mountain West Conference (MW)
Sun Belt Conference
Western Athletic Conference (WAC) – dropped football after the 2012 season, following a near-complete membership turnover that saw the league stripped of all but two of its football-sponsoring schools. The conference would reinstate football in 2021, but as part of the second-tier Division I FCS.

Ten "non-AQ" teams appeared in the nine following BCS games, with an overall record of 5-3:

 2005 Fiesta Bowl: Utah (MW) 35, Pittsburgh 7
 2007 Fiesta Bowl: Boise State (WAC) 43, Oklahoma 42 (OT)
 2008 Sugar Bowl: Georgia 41, Hawaii (WAC) 10
 2009 Sugar Bowl: Utah (MW) 31, Alabama 17
 2010 Fiesta Bowl: Boise State (WAC) 17, TCU (MW) 10
 2011 Rose Bowl: TCU (MW) 21, Wisconsin 19
 2013 Orange Bowl: Florida State 31, Northern Illinois (MAC) 10

Of these appearances, all were via automatic qualifying bids, except Boise State's participation in the highly controversial 2010 Fiesta Bowl in which the Broncos were selected via at-large bid and played fellow BCS Buster TCU.

New Year's Six and BCS Bowl Game appearances by conference
The following table lists the number of times that a member of each conference appeared in a New Year's Six bowl game or a BCS bowl game. For the 1998 to 2005 seasons there were four such games, from 2006 to 2013 there were five such games. Starting in 2014 there are six CFP associated bowl games (not including the national championship game) known as the New Year's Six. A * indicates a team from that conference won the national championship, while a ^ indicates a team from that conference was the runner-up in the national championship game.

Statistics reflect conference membership at the time of the game.  Note that the American filled the Big East's automatic bid in 2013.

Other sports

The Power Five conferences sponsor other sports in addition to football.

Numbers in italics denote special exceptions:

Football:
 ACC:  Notre Dame is an independent and not an ACC member in the sport.

Men's Soccer:
 Big 12:  The only current conference member that sponsors men's soccer, West Virginia, joined the Sun Belt Conference (SBC) for that sport in the 2022 season. UCF, now in the American Athletic Conference, is the only one of the four future Big 12 members with a men's soccer team; it will join SBC men's soccer when it becomes a Big 12 member in 2023.
 Pac-12: Five of the conference's 12 full members sponsor men's soccer. They are joined by single-sport member San Diego State, otherwise a member of the Mountain West Conference (MW). The conference will lose a men's soccer member in 2024 when UCLA moves to the Big Ten.
 SEC:  Only two members, Kentucky and South Carolina, sponsor soccer for men. As of 2022, both house these teams in the SBC, and their rivalry is the SEC Derby.

Men's Ice Hockey:
 ACC: Boston College plays in Hockey East. Notre Dame plays in the Big Ten Conference, but its membership is listed in italics as belonging to the ACC, its home conference for other sports.
 Big Ten: The count of six Big Ten schools includes only full conference members. Notre Dame is listed in its home conference of the ACC.
 Pac-12: The only conference member with a men's (or women's) ice hockey program, Arizona State, competes as an independent.

Men's Lacrosse:
 Big Ten:  Five of the 14 full members sponsor men's lacrosse.  A sixth team, Johns Hopkins, is a Division III member, but plays both men's and women's lacrosse in Division I and the Big Ten. Before a Division III rule change in early 2022, it was also one of five D-III schools specifically allowed by the NCAA to offer scholarships in its Division I sports. (Said rule change did not affect Hopkins' ability to offer lacrosse scholarships.)
 Pac-12: Utah became the first Pac-12 school, and also the first Division I school west of the Continental Divide, to sponsor men's lacrosse as a varsity sport, launching its team in the 2018–19 school year (2019 season). Utah men's lacrosse joined the ASUN Conference in July 2021.

Wrestling:
 Big 12:  Four of the 10 full members sponsor wrestling. As of the current 2022–23 season, they are joined by nine single-sport associates—Air Force and Wyoming (both MW); California Baptist and Utah Valley (both in the Western Athletic Conference); Missouri (SEC); North Dakota State and South Dakota State (both in the Summit League); Northern Colorado (in the Big Sky Conference); and Northern Iowa (in the Missouri Valley Conference). Oklahoma's wrestling affiliation once it leaves for the SEC has yet to be determined.
 Pac-12: Three full members sponsor wrestling. They are joined by single-sport members Cal Poly, CSU Bakersfield, and Little Rock. The two California single-sport members are otherwise members of the Big West Conference, while Little Rock is a full member of the Ohio Valley Conference.
 SEC: Missouri, the only SEC school to sponsor the sport, competed in the MAC through the 2020–21 season, after which it returned to its former full-time home of the Big 12 as a single-sport member.

Men's Volleyball: As of the ongoing 2023 NCAA men's volleyball season (2022–23 school year), 29 Division I members sponsor varsity men's volleyball, with a large majority being mid-major programs. In fact, D-I men's volleyball schools are outnumbered by Division II schools; members of both divisions compete under identical scholarship limits for a single national championship. Before 2012, this championship was also open to Division III schools, but explosive growth in the sport at that level in the 21st century led to the creation of a separate D-III championship. The only D-I all-sports leagues to sponsor the sport are the mid-major Big West Conference and Northeast Conference. With that in mind, the five Power Five schools with men's volleyball programs are aligned as follows:
 Big Ten: Ohio State and Penn State both play in single-sport leagues, respectively in the Midwestern Intercollegiate Volleyball Association and Eastern Intercollegiate Volleyball Association.
 Big 12: No current member sponsors men's volleyball. Future member BYU competes in the Mountain Pacific Sports Federation (MPSF), and will continue to do so after joining the Big 12.
 Pac-12: All three members with men's volleyball programs—Stanford, UCLA, and USC—compete in the MPSF. Even with UCLA and USC leaving for the Big Ten in 2024, the latter conference will have only four men's volleyball schools, two short of the minimum needed for an automatic bid to the combined D-I/D-II championship (and for official Big Ten sponsorship), making it likely that both will remain in MPSF men's volleyball.

Men's Water Polo: Only 25 Division I members sponsor varsity men's water polo. As with men's volleyball, a large majority of the D-I schools that sponsor the sport are mid-major programs. The NCAA conducts a single national championship open to all member schools, regardless of division.
 Pac-12: The only Power Five schools that sponsor the sport are the California members of the Pac-12—California, Stanford, UCLA, and USC. All compete in the MPSF. UCLA and USC will likely remain in the MPSF for men's water polo after their move to the Big Ten. 

Beach Volleyball:
A women-only sport at the NCAA level, beach volleyball is sponsored by only one Power Five conference, the Pac-12. Nine of that conference's schools sponsor the sport (with the exceptions being Colorado, Oregon State, and Washington State). UCLA and USC have not announced a future affiliation in that sport. Other Power Five schools that sponsor the sport are aligned as follows:
 ACC: Florida State competes in the Coastal Collegiate Sports Association (CCSA), a league that only sponsors beach volleyball plus men's and women's swimming & diving.
 Big Ten:  Nebraska competes as an independent.
 Big 12:  TCU competes in the CCSA.
 SEC: LSU and South Carolina compete in the CCSA. Mississippi State has been approved by the NCAA to compete, but has yet to do so.

Women's Field Hockey:
 Pac-12: The two Pac-12 members that sponsor field hockey, California and Stanford, play in the America East Conference.

Women's Ice Hockey:
 ACC: Boston College plays alongside its men's team in Hockey East. Syracuse plays in College Hockey America (CHA), a league that sponsors only women's ice hockey.
 Big Ten: Four Big Ten members sponsor women's ice hockey. Minnesota, Ohio State, and Wisconsin play in the Western Collegiate Hockey Association (which became women-only in 2021 after most of its former men's members left to reestablish the Central Collegiate Hockey Association), while Penn State plays in CHA.

Women's Lacrosse:
 Big Ten:  Six of the 14 full members sponsor women's lacrosse, as does future member USC. Johns Hopkins, as noted previously, is a Division III school that plays lacrosse in Division I.
 Big 12:  No current member sponsors women's lacrosse. Of the four announced future members, only Cincinnati, currently in The American, sponsors the sport; it has not yet announced a future lacrosse affiliation.
 Pac-12: Six of the 12 full members sponsor women's lacrosse, though USC will leave after the 2024 season (2023–24 school year). The Pac-12 will add two women's lacrosse associates in the 2024 season: San Diego State, already a Pac-12 men's soccer member, and UC Davis.
 SEC: The only two members that sponsor women's lacrosse, Florida and Vanderbilt, compete in The American.

Women's Rowing:
 Big 12:  Five of the 10 full members sponsor women's rowing. They are joined by Alabama and Tennessee, the only two SEC schools to sponsor the sport. These schools are listed in italics as part of the SEC. Future member UCF also sponsors rowing in its current home of The American.
 SEC: See Big 12 above. However, future SEC members Oklahoma and Texas both sponsor the sport. While the SEC has not announced any plans to launch a women's rowing league, SEC bylaws allow the conference to hold a championship event in any sport in which four members compete. Currently, the SEC sponsors a championship in women's equestrian, part of the NCAA Emerging Sports for Women program, with four participating schools.

Women's Water Polo: Only 33 Division I members sponsor varsity women's water polo. As with men's water polo, a large majority of the D-I schools that sponsor the sport are mid-major programs. The NCAA conducts a single national championship open to all member schools, regardless of division.
 Big Ten: The only two Big Ten schools that sponsor the sport, Indiana and Michigan, respectively compete in the MPSF and the varsity division of the Collegiate Water Polo Association.
 Pac-12: Five Pac-12 schools—the four California members, plus Arizona State—compete in the MPSF. At this time, UCLA and USC will likely remain in MPSF women's water polo after joining the Big Ten. Even after this move, the Big Ten will have only four members that sponsor the sport, with conference bylaws requiring six members before a new sport can be sponsored.

See also

Superconference
Mid-major

References

Notes

 
Bowl Championship Series
College Football Playoff